The  was an infantry division in the Imperial Japanese Army. It was created in July 1944 in Nagoya and disbanded 23 September 1945 in Toyohashi. It was a triangular division. The men of the division were drafted through 3rd military district, located in Nagoya.

Action
Initially the division was guarding the coast of Suruga Bay, excluding Chita Peninsula. Later the zone of responsibility was shifted to between Toyohashi and Lake Hamana. After completing the training with the Central District Army, the 73rd division was attached to Japanese Thirteenth Area Army from 1 February 1945. The division spent the time until surrender of Japan 15 August 1945 fortifying in anticipation of the Allied invasion which never came.

See also
 List of Japanese Infantry Divisions

 Independent Mixed Brigades (Imperial Japanese Army)

Notes and references
This article incorporates material from the article 第73師団 (日本軍) in the Japanese Wikipedia, retrieved on 14 January 2016.
 Madej, W. Victor. Japanese Armed Forces Order of Battle, 1937-1945 [2 vols] Allentown, PA: 1981

 Hata Ikuhiko, ed. "日本陸海軍総合事典 第2版" (Comprehensive Encyclopedia of the Imperial Japanese Navy and Army, Second Edition), Tōkyō Daigaku Shuppankai, 2005.

 Toyama Misao and Morimatsu Toshio, eds. "帝国陸軍編制総覧" (Comprehensive Sourcebook on Imperial Army Units), Fuyōshobō, 1987.

 『別冊歴史読本 戦記シリーズNo.32 太平洋戦争師団戦史』 (Special Edition of Rekishi Yomihon: War History Series No.32 – Battle History of Pacific War Divisions),  Shin Jinbutsu Ōraisha, 1996.

Japanese World War II divisions
Infantry divisions of Japan
Military units and formations established in 1944
Military units and formations disestablished in 1945
1942 establishments in Japan
1945 disestablishments in Japan